The 54th edition of the Vuelta a Colombia was held from June 6 to June 20, 2004.

Stages

2004-06-06: San Juan de Pasto — San Juan de Pasto (5.6 km)

2004-06-07: San Juan de Pasto — San Juan de Pasto (172.3 km)

2004-06-08: La Florida — Remolinos (108 km)

2004-06-09: Popayán — Palmira (149 km)

2004-06-10: Palmira — Santa Rosa de Cabal (197.6 km)

2004-06-11: Santa Rosa de Cabal — Jericó (171 km)

2004-06-12: Jericó — La Estrella (116.4 km)

2004-06-13: Medellín — Medellín (119 km)

2004-06-14: La Estrella — Jardín (151.4 km)

2004-06-15: Jardín — Anserma (203.7 km)

2004-06-16: Anserma — La Tebaida (140.4 km)

2004-06-17: La Tebaida — Girardot (176.4 km)

2004-06-18: Girardot — Funza (122.3 km)

2004-06-19: Bogotá — Alto de la Ye (21.9 km)

2004-06-20: Circuito en Bogotá (Sector de Ciudad Kennedy) (90 km)

Final classification

Teams 

Lotería de Boyacá

05 Orbitel

Aguardiente Antioqueño — Lotería de Medellín

Gobernación de Nariño

Alcaldía de Fusagasugá — Juegos Nacionales

Cicloacosta — Bello Instituto de Cancerología

Gobernación — Coldeportes — Lotería de Boyacá

Mixto Uno

Cicloases provincia de Cundinamarca

Mixto Dos

See also 
 2004 Clásico RCN

References 
 cyclingnews
 pedalear

Vuelta a Colombia
Colombia
Vuelta Ciclista